Space Warp is a fixed shooter video game released in arcades by Century Electronics in 1983.

Gameplay
The player begins with one ship capable of firing a single shot each time the firing button is pressed.  Several enemy ships are capable of firing two shots simultaneously.  It is possible to defeat these enemies and then dock their ships to the player's ship, increasing the player's rate of fire.  A maximum of three ships can be docked in this way.

External links

1983 video games
Fixed shooters
Arcade video games